Herbert John Gladstone, 1st Viscount Gladstone,  (7 January 1854 – 6 March 1930) was a British Liberal politician. The youngest son of William Ewart Gladstone, he was Home Secretary from 1905 to 1910 and Governor-General of the Union of South Africa from 1910 to 1914.

Appointed whip in 1899, Gladstone was an innovator who provided a long-term strategy, kept the party from splitting over the Second Boer War, introduced more modern constituency structures; and encouraged working-class candidates. In secret meetings with Labour leaders in 1903 he forged the Gladstone–MacDonald pact. In two-member constituencies, it arranged that Liberal and Labour candidates did not split the vote. Historians give him much of the credit for the Liberal triumph in 1906, with 397 MPs and a majority of 243. 

Rising to Home Secretary in 1906–1908, he was responsible for the Workman's Compensation Act, a Factory and Workshops Act, and in 1908 the eight hour working day underground in the Coal Mines Regulation Act. Historian John Grigg states that while his name is not often included in any list of radicals, his radical record is second to none in the Campbell-Bannerman Government. He was no firebrand but a good party man whose common sense inclined him to be less Gladstonian in the matter of state intervention then than his famous father had been. With his able under-secretary, Herbert Samuel, he sponsored no less than 34 Acts of Parliament during his time at the Home Office.

Background and education
Gladstone was the youngest son of Prime Minister William Ewart Gladstone and his wife Catherine, daughter of Sir Stephen Glynne, 8th Baronet, and was born in Downing Street where his father was living at the time as Chancellor of the Exchequer. William Henry Gladstone and Lord Gladstone of Hawarden were his elder brothers. He was educated at Eton and University College, Oxford, and lectured in history at Keble College, Oxford, for three years.

Political career

In 1880 Gladstone became private secretary to his father. That same year, having unsuccessfully contested the Middlesex constituency, he was elected Liberal Member of Parliament for Leeds. 

The Hawarden Kite was a famous newspaper  scoop of December 1885, an instance of flying a kite, made by Gladstone, who often served as his father's secretary. At the time William Ewart Gladstone was Leader of the Liberal Opposition. Herbert gave the report to Edmund Rogers of the National Press Agency in London. The key statement was that his father now supported home rule for Ireland.  The statement is accurate but it is unknown whether the father knew and approved of releasing it to the press. The bombshell announcement resulted in the fall of Lord Salisbury's Conservative government. Irish Nationalists, led by Charles Parnell's Irish Parliamentary Party, held the balance of power in Parliament. Gladstone's conversion to Home Rule convinced them to switch away from the Conservatives and support the Liberals using the 86 seats in Parliament they controlled. 

In the 1885 General Election Gladstone was returned to Parliament for Leeds West. Having been a junior Lord of the Treasury from 1881 to 1885, Gladstone became Deputy Commissioner of the Office of Works in 1885. The following year served for a brief period as Financial Secretary to the War Office in his father's third administration. In 1892, on his father's return to power, he was made Under-Secretary of State for the Home Department, and two years later he became First Commissioner of Works in Lord Rosebery's government, at which time he was also sworn of the Privy Council. The Liberals fell from power in 1895. He became the Liberals' Chief Whip in 1899 and in 1903 he negotiated on behalf of the Liberals an electoral pact with the Labour Representation Committee. He was president of the Darlington Liberal and Radical Association from early 1900.

Gladstone returned to office in 1905 when Sir Henry Campbell-Bannerman appointed him Home Secretary. According to historian Professor Ian Machin, Gladstone was not among “the foremost New Liberals such as Lloyd George and Churchill,” but he nevertheless played a large part in carrying a number of the Liberal welfare reforms during his time in office, including the Workmen's Compensation Act of 1906, the Children Act of 1908, and the Trade Boards Act of 1909.

As Prince of Wales, King Edward VII had come to enjoy warm and mutually respectful relations with W. E. Gladstone, whom Queen Victoria detested. These feelings did not extend to his son. In September 1908 he permitted Roman Catholic priests in vestments, led by Cardinal Vanutelli, to carry the Host in a procession through the streets of London. There were a flood of protests, and the King asked Gladstone to ban the procession to avert a breach of the peace. The Home Secretary was on holiday in Scotland at the time, and did not reply, giving rise to false rumours that the King – who was known to take an interest in Roman Catholic rituals when abroad – favoured the procession. In the end the Prime Minister H. H. Asquith had to ask Lord Ripon, the only Catholic Cabinet Minister, to ask for the Host and vestments to be cancelled.

The following year the King rebuked Gladstone for appointing two women, Lady Frances Balfour and May Tennant, to serve on a Royal Commission on reforming Divorce Law – the King thought divorce could not be discussed with "delicacy or even decency" before ladies. Philip Magnus suggests that Gladstone may have become a whipping-boy for the King's general irritation with the Liberal Government.

Gladstone was sacked in the reshuffle in 1910 and the King agreed, with some reluctance, to appoint him the first Governor-General of the Union of South Africa as well as the High Commissioner there. He was appointed a Knight Commander of the Order of St Michael and St George and raised to the peerage as Viscount Gladstone, of the County of Lanark, the same year.

Later life
After his return from South Africa in 1914, Lord Gladstone was appointed a Knight Grand Cross of the Order of the Bath (GCB), and spent much of the First World War being involved with various charities and charitable organisations, including the War Refugees Committee, the South African Hospital Fund, and the South African Ambulance in France. He was appointed a Knight Grand Cross of the Order of the British Empire (GBE) in 1917.

Family
In 1901 Lord Gladstone married Dorothy Mary, daughter of Sir Richard Paget, 1st Baronet, who was over twenty years his junior. He died in March 1930, aged 76, at his Ware home, and was buried in the town's Little Munden Church. There were no children from the marriage, and therefore his title became extinct at his death. Viscountess Gladstone died in June 1953.

References

Further reading
 Brown, Kenneth D. “The Appointment of Herbert Gladstone as Liberal Chief Whip in 1899.” in Labour and Working-Class Lives: Essays to Celebrate the Life and Work of Chris Wrigley, edited by Keith Laybourn and John Shepherd, (Manchester University Press, 2017), pp. 31–47, online.
 Cooke, A. B., and J. R. Vincent. “Herbert Gladstone, Forster, and Ireland, 1881-2.” Irish Historical Studies 17#68 (1971), pp. 521–48, online part 1.
 . “Herbert Gladstone, Forster, and Ireland, 1881-2 (II).” Irish Historical Studies 18#69 (1972): 74–89. online part 2.

 Lloyd, T. O. "The whip as paymaster: Herbert Gladstone and party organization." English Historical Review 89.353 (1974): 785–813. in JSTOR
Machin, Ian. "Herbert Gladstone" in Dictionary of Liberal Biography, Brack et al. (eds.) Politico's, 1998

 Matthew, H. C. G. "Gladstone, Herbert John, Viscount Gladstone (1854–1930)", Oxford Dictionary of National Biography, Oxford University Press, 2004; online edn, Sept 2010 accessed 11 Feb 2017 doi:10.1093/ref:odnb/33417

External links 

 
 

Alumni of University College, Oxford
British Secretaries of State
Children of prime ministers of the United Kingdom
English justices of the peace
English people of Scottish descent
Governors-General of South Africa
Knights Grand Cross of the Order of St Michael and St George
Knights Grand Cross of the Order of the Bath
Knights Grand Cross of the Order of the British Empire
Liberal Party (UK) MPs for English constituencies
Members of the Privy Council of the United Kingdom
People educated at Eton College
UK MPs 1880–1885
UK MPs 1885–1886
UK MPs 1886–1892
UK MPs 1892–1895
UK MPs 1895–1900
UK MPs 1900–1906
UK MPs 1906–1910
UK MPs who were granted peerages
Viscounts in the Peerage of the United Kingdom
1854 births
1930 deaths
Herbert Gladstone, 1st Viscount Gladstone
Peers created by Edward VII